Fireball is the fifth album by English rock band Deep Purple, released in 1971 and the second with the Mk II line-up. It was recorded at various times between September 1970 and June 1971. It became the first of the band's three UK No. 1 albums, though it did not stay on the charts as long as its predecessor, Deep Purple in Rock. Even though the album has sold over a million copies in the UK, it has never received a certification there.

Background
The album was the first one Deep Purple worked on after establishing their career with In Rock, which had been a critical and commercial success, staying on the charts for over a year. Because of this, the group were in continual demand for live concerts, which began to affect band members' health. Keyboardist Jon Lord suffered back problems (dating back to his days in The Artwoods when he had to transport a Hammond organ to gigs without the assistance of a road crew), and bassist Roger Glover had stomach problems which prevented him from performing live on several occasions. Guitarist Ritchie Blackmore felt he had been vindicated by the decision to concentrate on hard rock, and believed the group's success was largely because of him. This led to increasing conflict with singer Ian Gillan and the relationship between the two began to become strained.

Material for the album was rehearsed in Welcombe Manor, Devonshire in December 1970. The band cancelled several live performances in order to put together material that could serve as a follow-up to In Rock. "Strange Kind of Woman" was written during these sessions, and the track, along with "The Mule" was recorded in January 1971. Another song, "Freedom" was written at Welcombe and recorded during these sessions, but didn't make the final track listing. Other material was recorded in-between gigs through to March. "Strange Kind of Woman" was added to the group's live set at the end of January, quickly developing into a showpiece for Gillan to sing back Blackmore's guitar riffs in a call and response manner. The last song to be recorded was "Demon's Eye" in June.

Chart performance
Fireball reached the No. 1 position on the UK albums chart, while also hitting No. 1 in several other European countries like Germany, Austria or Sweden. In North America, it outperformed its predecessor, In Rock, reaching No. 32 in the US and No. 24 in Canada.

Singles
The original UK version had "Demon's Eye" as its third track, but did not include "Strange Kind of Woman",  which was instead released as a single there. The US version includes the latter track in place of the former. The boogie-inspired "Strange Kind of Woman" single reached No. 8 in the UK and Germany, and No. 1 in Denmark. "Fireball", the album's title track, was also released as a single and reached No. 15 in the UK.

"Strange Kind of Woman" has been a staple of the live set up to the present day, and "Fireball" also made a few live appearances, mainly as an encore as it required Ian Paice to use a double bass drum, which was set up during the break after the main set. "Strange Kind of Woman" and "The Mule" were played regularly live throughout 1972 (and appear on the live album Made in Japan), with the latter replacing an instrumental "Paint It Black" as a vehicle for Paice's drum solo.

"Anyone's Daughter" was played on the 1993–1994 tours, while "Fools", "No One Came", "I'm Alone", "Demon's Eye" and "No No No" have all made periodic appearances in various tours since 1996.

Releases and reissues
The original vinyl release was in a gatefold sleeve, with a generic Harvest LP-bag and a lyric-insert.

In September 2010, a limited-edition 24k gold CD was released by Audio Fidelity. The CD was mastered from the original master tapes by Steve Hoffman. The gold CD contained the original USA track listing with "Strange Kind of Woman" and does not have "Demon's Eye".

Response
Most of the band do not consider the album a classic, although it is one of Ian Gillan's favourites. He stated in a 1974 interview: "The reason I liked that so much was because I thought, from a writing point of view, it was really the beginning of tremendous possibilities of expression. And some of the tracks on that album are really, really inventive." However, Gillan also said that the inclusion of "Anyone's Daughter" on the album was "a good bit of fun, but a mistake."

Ritchie Blackmore, in particular, stated publicly that he was not overly pleased with Fireball. He said of the production: "That was a bit of a disaster, because it was thrown together in the studio. Managerial pressure, we had no time. 'You gotta play here, here, there, then you've got to make an LP.' I told them, 'if you want an LP, you've got to give us time.' But they wouldn't. I just threw ideas to the group that I thought up on the spur of the moment."

Jon Lord stated that Fireball "wanders slightly" and "goes to places that the band wasn't expecting it to go to." Lord did praise several songs on the album, including "No No No" and "Fools", and particularly singled out Ian Paice's drumming on the title track.

Later influences
On 9 April 2011 episode of That Metal Show, guitar virtuoso Yngwie Malmsteen stated that his older sister had given him Fireball when he was eight years old, and "it changed everything" for him. Similarly, Metallica drummer Lars Ulrich stated that he purchased a copy of Fireball within 12 hours after his father had taken him to a 1973 Deep Purple concert in Copenhagen, and he credits the concert and album for sparking his interest in hard rock music.

Likewise, Michael Monroe stated on Eddie Trunk's podcast that it was the first album he ever bought, and one of the first he ever heard along with Led Zeppelin II, and was a major influence to get him into a career in rock and roll.

King Diamond also mentions Fireball as the first studio album he purchased as a teenager and an important influence in his future career.

Track listings
All songs written by Ritchie Blackmore, Ian Gillan, Roger Glover, Jon Lord and Ian Paice.

Original European release
Side one

Side two

Original US/Canadian/Japanese release 
Side one

Side two

25th Anniversary Edition bonus tracks

Personnel
Deep Purple
 Ian Gillan – vocals
 Ritchie Blackmore – guitars
 Roger Glover – bass
 Jon Lord – keyboards, Hammond organ
 Ian Paice – drums

Production
 Recorded between September 1970 and June 1971 at De Lane Lea Studios and Olympic Studios
 Engineered by Martin Birch, Lou Austin and Alan O'Duffy
 Peter Mew – Original album remastering
 Tom Bender – Engineering work on the bonus tracks

Charts
 

Album

Weekly charts

Year-end charts

Singles

Certifications

References
Citations

Sources

 

Deep Purple albums
1971 albums
Harvest Records albums
Warner Records albums
Albums produced by Ritchie Blackmore
Albums produced by Jon Lord
Albums produced by Ian Paice
Albums produced by Ian Gillan
Albums produced by Roger Glover
Albums recorded at Olympic Sound Studios
Albums recorded in a home studio
Hard rock albums
Heavy metal albums